Cardamone is a surname. Notable people with the surname include:

Agostino Cardamone (born 1965), Italian boxer
MF Cardamone (born 1958), American artist
Richard J. Cardamone (1925–2015), American jurist
Tom Cardamone (born 1969), American writer
Valerio Cardamone (born 1999), Italian footballer